This is a gallery of the history of all the revisions made to the uniform jerseys and helmets of the National Football League's Cleveland Browns franchise.

Logo gallery

Current design

Jerseys
The Browns' home jersey is brown with three white and two orange stripes along the sleeves. Numbers and letters are in white. The road jersey is white with three brown and two orange stripes along the sleeves. Numbers and letters are in brown. The alternate jersey is also brown but lacks any sleeve stripes. Letters and numbers are in orange.

Pants
The Browns currently wear four different pant designs. The white pants contain two orange stripes surrounding one brown stripe on each side. The orange pants contain two brown stripes surrounding one white stripe on each side. The primary brown pants feature the same stripes scheme as the white pants. The orange, white and primary brown pants are used with both the home brown and road white jerseys. The alternate brown pants lack any stripes and are normally paired with the alternate brown jerseys.

Socks
The Browns currently wear three different sock designs. The primary brown socks contain three white and two orange stripes. The white socks contain three brown and two orange stripes. The alternate brown socks, used with the alternate brown jerseys, lack any stripes.

Ill-fated 'CB' logo helmet logo design
In 1965, NFL Creative Services designed a brown "CB" logo for the Browns' helmet. It was never used in any games.

Jersey changes made through the years

References

Cleveland Browns
Cleveland Browns